Jatiya Ganotantrik Party (JAGPA) is an unregistered minor political party in Bangladesh. Its founder is Shafiul Alam Pradhan who formed the JAGPA on 6 April 1980 through a press conference at Baitul Mokarram.

The current president of this political party is Tasmia Pradhan. The party is a member of the 18 Party Alliance. On 31 January 2021, the registration of the JAGPA was rejected by Bangladesh Election Commission (EC).

References 

Political parties in Bangladesh
Political parties established in 1980